Target price may mean:

A stock valuation at which a trader is willing to buy or sell a stock
Target pricing – the price at which a seller projects that a buyer will buy a product